Samuel Bacon Hillocks (February 11, 1869 – 1937) was a politician, Presbyterian minister and inventor of the Grain Door. From Alberta, Canada, he was born in Bathurst, New Brunswick.

Religion
Hillocks was one of the two ministers who presided over the Union Service in Calgary, Alberta, after the death of King Edward VII on May 20, 1910.

He resigned from his congregation on August 1, 1912

Political career
Hillocks ran for the Alberta Legislature for the first time in the 1913 Alberta general election in the electoral district of North Calgary. He defeated Liberal candidate George Henry Ross to win a term in office.

Hillocks would run for re-election in the 1917 Alberta general election. This time he would go down to defeat by Liberal candidate William McCartney Davidson.

Hillock would run again in the 1921 Alberta general election attempting to regain a seat in the legislature, he would be badly defeated in the new block vote system and finish a disappointing 18 place out of 21 candidates.

Hillocks invented the Grain Door and was issued a patent by the Canadian Intellectual Property Office on May 24, 1938.

References

External links
Legislative Assembly of Alberta Members Listing

Progressive Conservative Association of Alberta MLAs
Canadian inventors
1869 births
1937 deaths